This is a list of WFC compatible games on the Nintendo DS and Nintendo DSi handheld game consoles. These games are playable online out of the box, as long as the system is in range of a properly-configured WiFi router or a Nintendo Wi-Fi USB Connector, and are not to be confused with games that only allow for wireless multi-play within a close physical vicinity (ad-hoc).

After Nintendo's termination of the free Nintendo Wi-Fi Connection service on May 20, 2014, the majority of the game titles remain virtually playable, but their online connectivity and functionality are rendered defunct, even after some of them were re-released digitally. However, some online games can still be played on community-run servers.

Games

Nintendo DS

DSi-only Titles

DSiWare

See also
 List of Nintendo DS games
 List of DSiWare games and applications
 List of Nintendo 3DS Wi-Fi Connection games
 List of Wii Wi-Fi Connection games

DS